GNI may stand for:

 Global Network Initiative, an Internet freedom and privacy organization
 Grand Isle Seaplane Base, in Louisiana, United States
 Greater Nagoya Initiative, a Japanese business model project
 Gross national income
 Guniyandi language
 Lyudao Airport, in Taiwan